Ashleypark Burial Mound is a passage tomb and National Monument in the townland of Ashleypark, County Tipperary, Ireland.

Location
Ashleypark Burial Mound is located 2.1 km (1.3 mi) west of Ardcroney, 1 km north of Ashleypark House and Lake Ourna.

History

Ashleypark Burial Mound dates to the Neolithic: radiocarbon dating indicates a calendar date of c. 3350 BC for the burial in the chamber of an infant. The inner end of the structure contained an adult and child, cattle bones, a bone point, some chert flakes and Neolithic pottery, including sherds bearing channelled decoration. It lay until recently in an ancient oak forest. The site was damaged by bulldozing in 1980.

Description

The mound is described as a Linkardstown-type cist but may be a simple passage grave. It consists of a round mound encircled by two low wide banks with internal ditches giving an overall diameter of 90 m (100 yd). The inner mound is 26 m (30 yd) in diameter with a cairn core covered in clay.

The megalith is trapezoidal in shape, 5m long and narrowing from 2.3m wide at the SE to 1.3 m at the NW (open) end. It was built around a limestone erratic which serves as a floorstone.

References

34th century BC
Buildings and structures completed in the 4th millennium BC
National Monuments in County Tipperary
Archaeological sites in County Tipperary
Tumuli in Ireland
Megalithic monuments in Ireland